Kheda Lok Sabha constituency is one of the 26 Lok Sabha (parliamentary) constituencies in Gujarat state in western India.

Vidhan Sabha segments
Presently, Kheda Lok Sabha constituency comprises seven Vidhan Sabha (legislative assembly) segments. These are:

Members of Lok Sabha

Election Results

General Election 2019

General Election 2014

General Elections 2009

1957 Elections
 Dabhi Thakorshri Fatesinhji Ratansinhji (IND / Swatantra) : 127,646 
 Dabhi Fulsinhji Bharatsinhji (Congress) : 107,135

1984 Elections
 Ajitsinh Fulsinhji Dyabhai (Congress-Indira) : 292,019 votes  
 Satyam Patel (Lok Dal) : 144,586

See also
 Kheda district
 List of Constituencies of the Lok Sabha

Notes

Lok Sabha constituencies in Gujarat
Kheda district